Thomas "Tommy" O. Hicks Jr. is an American private equity investor living in Dallas, Texas. He is the son of Thomas Ollis Hicks, Sr.  Hicks is the co-chair of the Republican National Committee. Hicks is a Partner of Hicks Holdings, LLC and a Founding Partner of Scout SSG, LLC.  He serves as a Director for Resolute Energy Corporation.  He has served on the board of directors for Carol's Daughters Holdings and Berkshire Resources, LLC.  Hicks is Chairman of America First Policies and previously served as National Finance Co-Chairman for Donald J. Trump for President. Hicks served with Donald Trump Jr. on the America First Super PAC with a reception honoring senior White House appointees and top Ambassadors supporting President Trump.

Personal life
Hicks graduated from the University of Texas at Austin in 2001. He and his wife have three children.

In 2010, Hicks resigned from the board of Liverpool Football Club after telling a fan to "blow me fuck face" in a heated email exchange over the club's transfer budget.

Allegations of awareness of Trump's Ukraine Pressure Campaign
The New York Times reported on January 15, 2020, that Lev Parnas stated that he "communicated regularly" with Hicks and Joseph Ahearn, another Republican fund-raiser, about his (Parnas's) activities as part of Trump's "effort to win political advantage".

See also
Lev Parnas and Igor Fruman

References

Year of birth missing (living people)
Living people
Republican National Committee chairs
American company founders
University of Texas at Austin alumni